The Lyons Mail is a 1916 British silent film based on the 1877 play The Lyons Mail by Charles Reade, a very popular stage work of the Victorian era. A respectable French gentleman is mistaken for his doppelganger, a notorious highwaymen.

It was made by the Ideal Film Company, one of the leading British silent film studios. It should not be confused with a later sound version The Lyons Mail released in 1931 by Twickenham Studios. It was released in the United States in 1919.

Cast
H.B. Irving as Lesurques / Dubosc
Nancy Price as Janette
Harry Welchman as Andre
James Lindsay as Courriot
Tom Reynolds as Founiard
Windham Guise as Choppard
Nelson J. Ramsay as Durochat
Violet Campbell as Julie
Alfred Brydone as Jerome Lesurques
Charles Vane
Teddy Arundell

External links

 The Lyons Mail at BFI Film & TV Database
 The Lyons Mail at Silent Era

1916 films
British historical drama films
1910s historical drama films
1910s English-language films
British black-and-white films
British silent feature films
British films based on plays
Ideal Film Company films
1916 drama films
1910s British films
Silent drama films